Transit Blues is the sixth studio album by American metalcore band The Devil Wears Prada. It was released on October 7, 2016, through Rise Records, their only album on the label since 2007's Plagues. For the album, Giuseppe Capolupo, drummer of Demise of Eros, Haste the Day and Once Nothing, stated he had recorded on Transit Blues, after Daniel Williams left the band. It is also the first Prada album to feature Kyle Sipress on guitar.

Track listing

Personnel 

All credits by AllMusic

The Devil Wears Prada

 Mike Hranica – lead vocals, additional guitars
 Jeremy DePoyster – clean vocals, rhythm guitar
 Andy Trick – bass guitar
 Kyle Sipress – lead guitar, backing vocals

Additional personnel

 Giuseppe Capolupo – drums
 Jonathan Gering – keyboards, synthesizer

Production

 Dan Korneff – producer, engineer, mixing
 The Devil Wears Prada – producer
 Nick Sferlazza – engineer
 Ted Jensen – mastering
 Ben Wilcox – demo engineer, rehearsal director
 Stephen Harrison – vocals
 Anthony Barlich – photography
 Jonathan Gering – composer
 Mike Hranica – art direction
 Jarryd Nelson – editing
 Alex Prieto – editing
 Micah Sedmak – art direction, design, layout

Charts

References 

2016 albums
Rise Records albums
The Devil Wears Prada (band) albums